Le Haillan Rostand tram stop  is a tram stop on line A of the Tramway de Bordeaux. It is operated by Transports Bordeaux Métropole.

For most of the day on Mondays to Fridays, trams run at least every ten minutes to and from central Bordeaux. Services run less frequently in the early morning, late evenings, weekends and public holidays.

The tram stop has just one platform, serving a single terminal track. This single track threads its way through the complex grade-separated intersection between the Avenue de Magudas and the ring road until it reaches a point just before the next stop, where the line becomes double track.

References 

Bordeaux tramway stops
Tram stops in Le Haillan
Railway stations in France opened in 2007